Swallenia is a rare genus of plants in the grass family, found only in Death Valley National Park, California.

The only known species is Swallenia alexandrae, known by the common names Eureka dunegrass and Eureka Valley dune grass.  This genus was named for American botanist Jason Richard Swallen (1903-1991). The species was named for American philanthropist and paleontological collector Annie Montague Alexander.

Description
This is a rare plant endemic to Inyo County, California, where it is found on a single isolated dune system, the Eureka Valley Sand Dunes in the Eureka Valley of the Mojave Desert, within Death Valley National Park.

Description
Swallenia alexandrae is a coarse, tufted perennial grass which grows in sand from thick rhizomes. Its stiffly erect clums, sharp-leafed grass, and erect pale-colored panicle inflorescences are diagnostic.

Endangered status
This is a federally listed threatened species of the United States. The main threat to the species survival has been off-roading, which is no longer permitted in its habitat. Trespassing off-roaders and campers are still a threat to the five remaining occurrences.

References

External links
Calflora Database: Swallenia alexandrae (Eureka Valley dune grass,  Eureka dunegrass)
Jepson Manual treatment for Swallenia alexandrae
Grass Manual Profile
Swallenia alexandrae — UC Photos gallery

Chloridoideae
Monotypic Poaceae genera
Native grasses of California
Endemic flora of California
Flora of the California desert regions
Natural history of the Mojave Desert
Natural history of Inyo County, California
~
Threatened flora of California